The men's 500 meter at the 2014 KNSB Dutch Single Distance Championships took place in Heerenveen at the Thialf ice skating rink on Friday 25 October 2013. It consisted of twice 500 meter where the speed skaters started once in the inner and once in the outer lane. Although this tournament was held in 2013 it was part of the speed skating season 2013–2014. There were 24 participants.

Statistics

Result

Source:

Draw 1st 500 meter

Draw 2nd 500 meter

References

Single Distance Championships
2014 Single Distance